The Ophiurida are an order of echinoderms within the class Ophiuroidea. It includes the vast majority of living brittle stars.

Characteristics
Ophiurida have bursae for respiration and excretion, and dorsal and ventral arm shields are present and usually well developed. Arms are unbranched and incapable of coiling vertically. Most are five-armed, some with 4 or 6 arms as an abnormality, but others properly bear six or seven arms.  The madreporite is on the oral surface. The digestive glands are entirely within the central disc. They move their arms side to side by means of ball-and-socket joints.  Tropical species tend to contrast color from the environment, but most others prefer to blend in.  These biochromes do not include echinochromes.

Systematics and phylogeny 
There is currently no consensus as to the subdivision of the Ophiurida.
The order has been divided into the following suborders and infraorders

 Ophiomyxina
 Ophiurina
 Hemieuryalina
 Chilophiurina
 Gnathophiurina
 Ophiodermatina
 Ophiolepidina
Another classification scheme divides it into the following suborders:
 Chilophiurina Matsumoto, 1915       
 Laemophiurina Matsumoto, 1915  
 Ophiothricidae Ljungman, 1867 (= Ophiotrichidae)
 Ophiurina Müller & Troschel, 1840
Another classification scheme divides it as:
 Chilophiurina
 Laemophiurina
 Gnathophiurina

Ecology
Ophiurida have a world-wide distribution range and are found in oceans in different depths. Most of them are herbivores or detritus feeders.

References

 
Ophiuroidea
Extant Devonian first appearances